Imanpa is a community in the Northern Territory of Australia. It is seven kilometres north of the Lasseter Highway, the main road running between the Stuart Highway and Uluru (Ayers Rock). Imanpa lies 160 kilometres east of Uluru and 200 kilometres south west of Alice Springs. It is seventeen kilometres from Mount Ebenezer Roadhouse which is owned and run by the community, along with Angas Downs Station / Indigenous Protected Area.

Population
At the 2006 census, Imanpa had a population of 149.

References

MacDonnell Region
Aboriginal communities in the Northern Territory
Australian Aboriginal freehold title
Towns in the Northern Territory